Port Grenaugh is a cove in the SE of the Isle of Man at the foot of Glen Grenaugh, in the parish of Santon, and the mouth of Grace's stream which originates in the Newtown area of the parish by Ballakissack farm.

Close by is Cronk ny Merriu - the remains of one of the island's promontory forts which date back almost 2000 years.

External links
 Map showing Port and Glen Grenaugh

Bays of the Isle of Man